Frolic may refer to:

Maritime 
 HMS Frolic, one of several ships of the British Royal Navy
 USS Frolic, one of several ships of the United States Navy
 Frolic (brig), a historic shipwreck off the coast of California
 Frolic, a trimaran designed by Arthur Piver

Music 
 Frolic (album), by Anneli Drecker, 2005
 "Frolic", the opening theme of the HBO show Curb Your Enthusiasm

Other uses
 Frolic (law), a concept in tort law
 George Alexis Weymouth (1936–2016), or Frolic Weymouth, American artist and conservationist
 A type of festive occasion in 19th century Norfolk, UK, as depicted in Thorpe Water Frolic, Afternoon by Joseph Stannard